Balçova Dam is a dam in İzmir Province, Turkey, built between 1970 and 1980.

See also
List of dams and reservoirs in Turkey

External links
DSI

Dams in İzmir Province
Dams completed in 1980
Balçova